Spandana may refer to:

 Spandana (2015 film), a 2015 Sri Lankan romantic horror film
 Spandana (1978 film), a 1978 Kannada-language film (cinematography by B. C. Gowrishankar)
 Divya Spandana (born 1982), actress and politician from Karnataka
 Spandana, a character in the Kannada-language TV series Marali Manasagide (2021)
 Spandana, a character in the Kannada-language film Kismath (2018)